East Stroudsburg Senior High School South is a public high school located at 279 North Courtland Street in East Stroudsburg in Monroe County, Pennsylvania. The school's mascot is the cavalier. The school is part of the East Stroudsburg Area School District.

As of the 2021-22 school year, the school had an enrollment of 1,336 students, according to National Center for Education Statistics data. The student-to-teacher ratio is 1 teacher to 14.68 students, roughly in line with the state average of  15.1. The student body is 62.9% White, 17.6% African American, 17.1% Hispanic or Latino of any race, 2.3% Asian American, and less than 1% Native American.

Scheduling
The school utilizes block scheduling. Each block is 90 minutes long. Most classes only last for one semester. Each period is 45 minutes long, with the exception of those during block 3. 1st and 2nd periods are in Block 1, 3rd and 4th periods are in Block 2, and 9th and 10th periods are in Block 4. Block 3 is 120 minutes long and the four periods are each 30 minutes long, one of which will be lunch. Normally on a student's schedule it may say a class, then lunch, and then back to the original class. This means that in the middle of the class, the bell will ring to signal that the class should go to lunch. After lunch, the class will then return.

School map
The school is split into two divisions: the Maple Building and the regular building. These two buildings are connected by a single hallway, which runs by the cafeteria.

Renovation
The school has undergone a 92 million dollar renovation project. The district added a new 3 story wing, cafeteria, Gym as well as renovating the existing building. The stadium has been fitted with a turf field and an all-weather track, as well as improvements to the visitors' team's stands.

The necessary renovation effort comes to a loss of local history. To make room for expansion, the district demolished the historic 19th-century J.S. Bunnell School, which was adjacent to the high school. "The Bunnell" once housed grades 1 through 12 until 1963 when the current high school opened. The Bunnell then became a junior high until 1993 when JTL opened. Between then and its destruction in 2008, it served as an extension of the high school. Because the district failed to maintain the building, it fell into disrepair and was determined that it would cost the district more money to update it than the district was willing to spend.

The current spot of the Bunnell School has been made into a faculty parking area. Another building that was torn down for parking was the old District Administration building, which was the former North Courtland Elementary School.

South Side Live
Every morning after first block, teachers turn on their TVs for South Side Live, a student broadcast, which is generally about 10 minutes long. It is a morning announcement about updates in the school such as weather, announcements for activities, and sports. It will often include special videos, that can feature special school events or important events occurring in the world. The school's Studio Broadcasting class produces the broadcast.

Due to the new Covid-19 scheduling, South Side Live is now only shown once a week.

Athletics

East Stroudsburg South competes athletically in the Eastern Pennsylvania Conference (EPC) in the District XI division of the Pennsylvania Interscholastic Athletic Association, one of the premier high school athletic divisions in the nation.

East Stroudsburg South has a thriving athletic tradition. Many of its teams have won several awards throughout the school's history. Current sports offered at this school are the following, along with their records for the most recent competition season in parentheses:

Accomplishments
The boys' 1993–94 basketball team advanced to the District XI AAAA Basketball semi-finals eventually losing to the State Champion Chester High School
The boys' 1995 football team won the District XI championship beating Stroudsburg High School and then lost to Plymouth-Whitemarsh High School in the state playoffs.
The girls' 2006–07 basketball team advanced the PIAA quarterfinal playoffs, but lost to Council Rock North High School.
The boys' 2009 football team advanced to the District XI semifinals before losing to Parkland High School.
The boys' 2010 football team advanced to the District XI semifinals before losing to Easton Area High School
The girls' 2011 tennis team advanced to the District XI finals before losing to Parkland High School.
The boys' 2017–18 basketball team won the District XI championship beating Northampton High School after winning the Eastern Pennsylvania Conference Mountain Division title and advanced to the PIAA first round before losing to Neshaminy High School
The boys' 2018 football team beat Pocono Mountain East High School to win the District XI AAAAA championship.
The coed cheerleading team beat Pocono Mountain West High School to win the 2018-2019 District XI Coed Cheerleading championship.

Turkey Day Rivalry
East Stroudsburg High School has always found a firm rivalry with its neighbors Stroudsburg High School. They have played every year since 1945, and starting in 1952—with a few exceptions—the teams have met on Thanksgiving morning is what is known as the Turkey Day Game. The winning team receives the Little Brown Jug trophy, which stays with the winning school until the next Turkey Day Game. If the winner is away they walk home with a police escort through the other team's town, a tradition that began in 1967. The competition has gained the attention of Sports Illustrated. The rivalry is presented in the American football on Thanksgiving page.

From 1995–98, the teams met during the regular season. Starting in 1999, they began playing each other twice each year, once during the regular season and again on Thanksgiving. The early games do not count in the Turkey Day rivalry records.

Through 2013, Stroudsburg holds a 37–26–5 edge over East Stroudsburg South in the Little Brown Jug series.

Outcomes Since 1945:

All-Time Turkey Day W-L-T Pct. (Coaches):

Clubs and activities

Spring Production/Musical
Marching band
Jazz band
Choraliers
Choralettes
Chess Team
Mock Trial
Reading Olympics
Scholastic Scrimmage
Speech and Debate
Model United Nations
FBLA
SADD
Key Club
Science Olympiad
Step Team
Envirothon
Math/Computer Club
Philosophy Club
Glee Club
Wilderness Club
Anime Club
DECA
Go Club
Physics Club
Gay-Straight Alliance
Multicultural Affairs
Performance Club
Green Team
Student Government
Newspaper

Music program
East Stroudsburg South has a thriving music program. Concert Choir and Concert Band are offered as electives during school, and the choir currently consists of over 200 members, while the band contains almost 100 members. The school regularly sends several students to PMEA District Chorus, Band, and Orchestra festivals. The school also offers extracurricular musical activities, such as Marching Band, Jazz Band, Choraliers, and the musical.

Choraliers
The Choraliers are the select choir in East Stroudsburg South. In order to be eligible, a student must be enrolled in the regular Chorus class and audition successfully for a spot. The group usually is composed of about 40 members. All grade levels in the school are represented in the group. The Choraliers function as the chorus that represents the entire school at school district events. They also are evaluated at adjudications, and participated in Music in the Parks at Hersheypark in 2009 and 2011, both times winning best overall high school choir with a superior rating.

Musical
Every year, East Stroudsburg South stages a musical. These musicals have been praised for the participants' musicianship, acting, and the overall production of the show. They receive many nominations at the annual Spotlight Awards at the Sherman Theater, several of which result in awards.

Academic clubs
East Stroudsburg South has several clubs that compete against other schools, including FBLA and DECA. The chess team and speech and debate teams also regularly placed in the top three of the former Mountain Valley Conference, and the Science Olympiad team consistently finished in the top half of the regional competition.

In 2010, one of the Reading Olympics teams placed first at the regional competition at Easton Area High School. In 2011, one of the teams placed third. In 2012, one of the Reading Olympics teams placed first with a score of 72.

In 2011, the Mock Trial team placed first at the Monroe County Bar Association Invitational.

In 2012, the Science Olympiad team qualified for the state finals for the first time in school history, placing second overall at the regional finals.

In 2013, one of the Envirothon teams placed 1st at the county Envirothon and qualified for the state finals, the first team from the school to do so in school history.

Notable alumni
Kyshoen Jarrett, former professional football player, Washington Redskins
Darryl Longdon, professional soccer player, Dominica
James Mungro, former professional football player, Detroit Lions and Indianapolis Colts 
Ken Parrish, former professional football player, Atlanta Falcons, Jacksonville Jaguars, New York Jets, Philadelphia Eagles, and San Francisco 49ers 
Robopop, music producer and songwriter  
Jimmy Terwilliger, head football coach, East Stroudsburg University of Pennsylvania

References

External links
East Stroudsburg High School Official website
East Stroudsburg High School South athletics
East Stroudsburg High School South sports coverage at The Express-Times

Public high schools in Pennsylvania
Educational institutions established in 1893
Schools in Monroe County, Pennsylvania
1893 establishments in Pennsylvania